Astromil is a Portuguese parish of the municipality of Paredes. The population in 2011 was 1,086, in an area of 1.93 km2.

References

Freguesias of Paredes, Portugal